PSTV  may refer to:

 Potato spindle tuber viroid is a viroid which affects potatoes
 PlayStation TV, a microconsole by Sony